Tammy Eloise Jackson (born December 3, 1962) is an American former college and professional basketball player who was a center in the Women's National Basketball Association (WNBA) for six seasons in the 1990s and early 2000s.  Jackson played college basketball for the University of Florida, and played professionally for the Houston Comets and Washington Mystics of the WNBA.  She is an Olympic bronze medalist.

Early years 

Jackson grew up in Gainesville, Florida.  She attended Buchholz High School in Gainesville, where she played high school basketball for the Buchholz Bobcats.

College career 

After graduating from high school, Jackson accepted an athletic scholarship to attend the University of Florida in Gainesville, where she played for the Florida Gators women's basketball team from 1982 to 1985.  During her four years as a Gators, she scored 1,895 points, completed almost 56 percent of her shots from the floor, recovered 1,141 rebounds, and blocked 121 shots on defense.  She was a three-time first-team All-Southeastern Conference (SEC) selection, and a senior team captain.  She remains the third leading all-time scorer in Lady Gators basketball history.

Jackson was inducted into the University of Florida Athletic Hall of Fame as a "Gator Great" in 1995, and honored again as an "SEC Great" in 2003.  Jackson graduated from the University of Florida with a bachelor's degree in health and human performance in 2007.

Florida statistics
Source

Professional career 

After her college playing career was over, she played in various international leagues due to the lack of women's professional basketball leagues in the United States.  Jackson was a member of the United States women's national basketball teams that won a world championship in 1990, and a bronze medal at the 1992 Summer Olympics.

When the WNBA began play in 1997, the Houston Comets picked Jackson in the second round of the 1997 WNBA Draft and she became one of the original players in the league.  She played all but two games of her WNBA career with the Comets, mostly in a reserve role, as she played in 143 games and started nine of them.  She was with the Comets when they won the three of their first four WNBA titles from 1997 to 2000.  She retired at age 39 in 2002; at the time, she was the oldest player in the WNBA.

See also 

 List of Florida Gators in the WNBA
 List of Olympic medalists in basketball
 List of University of Florida alumni
 List of University of Florida Athletic Hall of Fame members
 List of University of Florida Olympians

References

External links 
 Tammy Jackson – Official WNBA player profile

1962 births
Living people
American expatriate basketball people in Italy
American expatriate basketball people in Japan
American expatriate basketball people in Spain
American expatriate basketball people in Sweden
American women's basketball players
Basketball players at the 1992 Summer Olympics
Basketball players from Gainesville, Florida
Centers (basketball)
Florida Gators women's basketball players
Houston Comets players
Medalists at the 1992 Summer Olympics
Olympic bronze medalists for the United States in basketball
Washington Mystics players
United States women's national basketball team players